Newark Liberty International Airport , originally Newark Metropolitan Airport and later Newark International Airport, is an international airport straddling the boundary between the cities of Newark in Essex County and Elizabeth in Union County, New Jersey. It is jointly owned by the cities and leased to its operator, the Port Authority of New York and New Jersey. It is the second-busiest airport in the New York airport system, behind John F. Kennedy International Airport.

It is near the Newark Airport Interchange, the junction between Interstate 95 and Interstate 78 (both components of the New Jersey Turnpike), as well as U.S. Routes 1 and 9, which has junctions with U.S. Route 22, Route 81, and Route 21. AirTrain Newark connects the terminals with the Newark Liberty International Airport Station. The station is served by NJ Transit's Northeast Corridor Line and North Jersey Coast Line. Amtrak's Northeast Regional and Keystone Service trains also stop at the station.

The airport was constructed adjacent to Port Newark and U.S. Route 1. After the Port Authority took it over in 1948, an instrument runway, a terminal building, a control tower, and an air cargo center were added. The airport's Building 51 from 1935 is a National Historic Landmark. Newark is one of three major airports serving the New York metropolitan area; the others are John F. Kennedy International Airport and LaGuardia Airport, which are also operated by the Port Authority. Newark is the oldest of the three.

In 2019, the airport served 46,336,452 passengers, the most in its history. During 2022 EWR served 43,402,059 passengers, which made it the 29th-busiest airport by passenger traffic in the world. Newark serves 50 carriers and is the largest hub for United Airlines by available seat miles. The airline serves about 63% of passengers at EWR making it the largest tenant at the airport.

The airports in the New York metropolitan area, including Newark, combine to create the largest airport system in the United States, the second-largest in the world in terms of passenger traffic and largest in the world in terms of total flight operations. In 2022  Newark Airport served 43 million passengers, JFK served 55 million, and LaGuardia served 29 million.

History
From the 1920s, Newark, New Jersey, was the site of two airfields – Heller Field, which opened in 1919, and Hadley Field, which opened in 1924 – used by the United States airmail service. In May 1921, Heller Field was closed and all air mail services moved to Hadley Field, which by 1927 also served four airlines. The US Postal Service, however, desired to have an airfield closer to New York City. In 1927, people and organizations both national and local in scope began calling for a new airport in the area of Newark, including Newark's mayor, Thomas Raymond.

On August 3, 1927, Raymond ordered plans for a new airport. Construction, estimated to cost $6 million, began on April 1, 1928, along US Route 1 and Port Newark. The airport opened on October 1, 1928, as the Newark Metropolitan Airport. It was the first major airport to serve the New York metropolitan area, and the first commercial airport in the United States with a paved airstrip.

20th century

The first lease for space at Newark Airport was signed by Canadian Colonial Airways in April 1928.

The nation's first air traffic control tower and airport weather station opened at Newark in 1930, and it became the first airport to allow nighttime operations after installing runway lights in 1952. The Art Deco style Newark Metropolitan Airport Administration Building, adorned with murals by Arshile Gorky, was built in 1934 and dedicated by Amelia Earhart in 1935. It served as the terminal until the opening of the North Terminal in 1953. Construction of the Brewster Hangar began in 1937 and continued through 1938. This hangar was the most advanced of its time. It was added to the National Register of Historic Places in 1979 and is now a museum and Port Authority Police headquarters. 

Despite this, critics said the airport was poorly designed because there was no separation of incoming and outbound passengers and no thought given to future expansion, though this did not stop Newark from being the busiest commercial airport. United Airlines, American Airlines, Eastern Airlines, and TWA signed 10-year leases with the airport which ended in 1938. Then they would pay on a month-to-month basis until LaGuardia Airport opened in December 1939; by mid-1940, all passenger airlines had left Newark, no longer making it the world's busiest airport.

During World War II, the field was closed to commercial aviation while it was taken over by the United States Army for logistics operations. In 1945, captured German aircraft brought from Europe on HMS Reaper for evaluation under Operation Lusty were off-loaded at Newark and then flown or shipped to Freeman Field in Indiana or Naval Air Station Patuxent River in Maryland. The airlines returned to Newark in February 1946. In 1948, the city of Newark leased the airport to the Port of New York Authority (now the Port Authority of New York and New Jersey). As part of the deal, the Port Authority took operational control of the airport and began investing heavily in capital improvements, including new hangars, a new terminal and runway 4/22. 

On December 16, 1951, a Miami Airlines C-46 bound for Tampa lost a cylinder on takeoff from runway 28 and crashed in Elizabeth, killing 56. On January 22, 1952, an American Airlines CV-240 crashed in Elizabeth while on approach to Runway 6, killing all 23 aboard and seven on the ground. On February 11, 1952, a National DC-6 crashed in Elizabeth after takeoff from runway 24, killing 29 of 63 on board and four on the ground.
Inevitably, the airport was closed for some months; airline traffic resumed later in the year, but the airport's continued unpopularity and the New York area's growing air traffic led to searches for new airport sites. The Port Authority's proposal to build a new airport at what is now the Great Swamp National Wildlife Refuge was defeated by local opposition.

Through the early 1970s, Newark had a single terminal building located on the north side of the field by what is now Interstate 78. A new control tower opened in 1960, and the terminal was expanded from 26 to 32 gates in 1965. A $200 million expansion of the airport, which was to include three terminals, began in 1967 after three years of planning. In 1973, the airport became Newark International Airport. Former Terminal A and present Terminal B opened in 1973, although some charter and international flights requiring customs clearance remained at the North Terminal. The main building of Terminal C was completed at the same time, but only metal framing work was completed for the terminal's satellites. It lay dormant until the mid-1980s, when for a brief time the west third of the terminal was equipped for international arrivals and used for People Express transcontinental flights. Terminal C was finally completed and opened in June 1988.

Underutilized in the 1970s, Newark expanded dramatically in the 1980s. People Express struck a deal with the Port Authority to use the North Terminal as its air terminal and corporate office in 1981 and began operations at Newark that April. It grew quickly, increasing Newark's traffic through the 1980s. Virgin Atlantic began service between Newark and London in 1984, challenging JFK's status as New York's international gateway. Federal Express (now known as FedEx Express) opened its second hub at the airport in 1986. When People Express merged into Continental Airlines in 1987, operations (including corporate office operations) at the North Terminal were reduced and the building was demolished to make way for cargo facilities in the early 1997. This merger started the dominance of Continental Airlines, and later United Airlines, at Newark Airport.

On July 22, 1981, a railroad tank car carrying ethylene oxide caught fire at the Port Newark freight yard, causing the evacuation of a one-mile radius, which included the evacuation of the North Terminal building of Newark International Airport.

In late 1996, the airport's monorail system opened, connecting the three terminals, the overflow parking lots and garages, and the rental car facilities. A new International Arrivals Facility also opened in Terminal B that year. The monorail was expanded to the new Newark Airport train station on Amtrak's Northeast Corridor line in 2001 and was renamed AirTrain Newark.

21st century

In 2000, The Port Authority moved the historic Building 51 and renamed it to Building One. It now is where the airport's administrative offices are.

After the hijacking and crash of United Airlines Flight 93 in the September 11 attacks in 2001 while en route from Newark to San Francisco, the airport's name was changed from Newark International Airport to Newark Liberty International Airport in 2002.

In October 2015, Singapore Airlines announced intentions to resume direct nonstop service between Newark and its main hub at Singapore Changi Airport, which had ended in November 2013. The airline announced that service would resume some time in 2018, and the Airbus A350-900ULR was chosen as the aircraft for the route. On May 30, 2018, Singapore Airlines officially announced that nonstop service between Newark and Singapore would begin on October 11, 2018, and Newark Liberty once again became host to what was then the world's longest non-stop flight.

Continental Airlines (now merged with United Airlines) began flying from Newark to Beijing-Capital on June 15, 2005, and to Delhi on November 1, 2005. The airline soon started flights to Mumbai. On July 16, 2007, Continental announced it would seek government approval for nonstop flights between Newark and Shanghai-Pudong in 2009. Continental began flights to Shanghai from Newark on March 25, 2009, using a Boeing 777-200ER aircraft. Newark was the only New York area airport used by Philippine Airlines (PAL), until financial problems in the late 1990s caused it to terminate this service.

In June 2008, flight caps were put in place to restrict the number of flights to 81 per hour. The flight caps, in effect until 2009, were intended to be a short-term solution to Newark's congestion. After the cap expired, the FAA embarked on a seven-year-long project to reduce congestion in all three New York area airports and the surrounding flight paths.

Newark is a major hub for United Airlines (Continental Airlines before the 2010–12 merger). United has its Global Gateway at Terminal C, having completed a major expansion project that included a new, third concourse and a new Federal Inspection Services facility. With its Newark hub, United has the most service of any airline in the New York area. On March 6, 2014, United opened a new , $25 million hangar on a  parcel to accommodate their wide-body aircraft during maintenance. In 2015, the airline announced plans to leave JFK altogether and streamline its transcontinental operations at Newark. On July 7, 2016, the United States Department of Transportation announced that Newark was one of ten cities to first operate flights to José Martí International Airport in Havana, Cuba.

Southwest Airlines began service at the airport in 2011, flying to ten cities. It ended all Newark service in November 2019, primarily due to the Boeing 737 MAX groundings, low demand, and inadequate facilities, and consolidated its New York–area operations to Long Island and LaGuardia.

In 2016, the Port Authority approved and announced a redevelopment plan to replace Terminal A, set to fully open in 2022. A $2.7 billion investment, the new terminal was expected to increase passenger flow and gate flexibility between airlines, and would also be accompanied by a replacement for the AirTrain Newark monorail system, scheduled for completion in 2024. The new Terminal A officially opened on December 8, 2022. The new Terminal A has 33 gates, increasing Newark's gate total to 125, including 16 international gates that can be alternated so that 2 narrow-body aircraft or 1 wide-body aircraft can occupy a space.

As a result of the COVID-19 pandemic in the United States across the New York City area, aircraft operations in Terminal A drastically changed with only 15,892,892 passengers in 2020, despite having 46,336,452 the previous years, the most in its history. Alaska Airlines trimmed its Newark schedule to three daily flights and leased their gates (A30 and A31) to JetBlue to accommodate their increased operations. In June 2022, United Airlines announced they would cut about 50 domestic flights from Newark in an effort to reduce delays. On January 11, 2023, the FAA system outage across the United States caused 103 flights from Newark to be grounded, the third-most grounded flights across the country.

In October 2022, PANYNJ announced their EWR Vision which will cover short- and long-term development through 2065. Officials named Arup, a global top aviation planning and design firm, to partner with SOM, who has done several projects with the Port Authority and EWR prior. The start of the vision included finishing the new Terminal A, which was completed in January 2023, and the old AirTrain which is expected to be completed in 2026. Goals for the project include creating a World Class Gateway for New Jersey, creating long term economic growth, and creating a phasable plan that will not affect the airport's operations while expanding it to accommodate passenger and cargo growth in that time.

 Newark serves 50 carriers and is the third-largest hub for United Airlines after Chicago O'Hare and Houston George Bush Intercontinental. During a 12-month period ending in March 2022, over 63% of all passengers at the airport were carried by United Airlines. The second-busiest airline is JetBlue Airways, which carries 11.4%, and then American Airlines, which carries 5.6%. The second largest tenant is FedEx, which operates in 3 buildings on around two million square feet of the airport's property.

Facilities

Runways and taxiways

 4L/22R: , asphalt/concrete, grooved
 4R/22L: , asphalt, grooved
 11/29: , asphalt, grooved
 Helipad H1: , asphalt

Runway 11/29 is one of the three runways built during World War II.

EWR has more than 12 miles of 75-foot-wide taxiways. In 2014, the Port Authority completed a $97 million dollar rehabilitation project of Runway 4L/22R while adding four new taxiways to reduce delays. Three of the new taxiways allow multiple planes to stage for departure at the end of the runway, reducing takeoff delays, while the other new taxiway will allow arriving planes to exit the runway faster and get to the gates quicker.

All approaches except Runway 29 have Instrument Landing Systems and Runway 4R is certified for Category III approaches. Runway 22L had been upgraded to CAT III approach capability.

Runway 4L/22R is primarily used for takeoffs while 4R/22L is primarily used for landings, and 11/29 is used by smaller aircraft or when there are strong crosswinds on the two main runways. Helipad H1 is used by Blade, a helicopter service that goes to EWR and JFK from their heliport on East 34th street in New York City with the purpose of going to and from the airport in under 5 minutes. They use the Bell 407 helicopter.

Unlike the other two major New York–area airports, JFK and LaGuardia, which are located directly next to large bodies of water (Jamaica Bay and the East River, respectively) and whose runways extend at least partially out into them, Newark Airport and its runways are completely land-locked. While located just across Interstate 95 from Newark Bay and not far from the Hudson River, the airport does not directly front upon either body of water.

Cargo 

In 1997, the North Terminal was torn down to make a new air cargo facility. The airport is in both Newark, Essex County and Elizabeth, Union County, and is adjacent to Port Newark–Elizabeth Marine Terminal and Foreign-Trade Zone No. 49. It serves more than 45 air carriers with nearly 1,200 daily arrivals and departures to domestic and international destinations. Climate-controlled warehouse areas and cold storage accommodate perishable items.

Aeroterm operates buildings 339 and 340, and the designated United Airlines cargo facility was constructed in 2001. The FedEx Cargo Complex is a $60-million sort facility at its Newark Hub which includes Buildings 347, 156 and most of 155. Building 157 is a cargo building used by several tenants. Construction of it was completed in 2003. UPS completed construction of their new cargo building in 2019.

Air traffic control 

In December 1935, the airport's first air control station came into existence following a flight that crashed outside of Kansas City, killing five people, including a U.S. senator. The airport's original terminal, or Building 51, also known as the Administration Building housed the first air traffic control tower for the airport, and was designed by John Homlish in the 1930s. A concrete brutalist-styled and toothbrush-shaped control tower was built in 1960, and opened on January 18 of that year, designed by architect Allan Gordon Lorimer; the cost of the construction was estimated to be $1.5 million. In 2002, this control tower closed and was replaced by a new and taller control tower. The current air traffic control tower is 325 feet tall (99 m). The old toothbrush control tower built in 1960 was demolished in 2004. The current tower is located next to a Marriott hotel, which is located on the airport's property. The current tower overlooks the Manhattan Skylines and the George Washington Bridge.

Other facilities 
There are several hotels adjacent to Newark Liberty International Airport. Hotels such as Courtyard by Marriott and the Holiday Inn are located on the airport's property. Signature Flight Support is the only fixed-base operator at the airport, providing various services to private aircraft. Terminals A, B, and C all have short-term parking lots. Garage P4 can access the AirTrain directly. Economy Parking P6 can be accessed from the terminals using the Port Authority shuttle bus.

Terminals
Across the airport's three terminals, there are 125 gates: Terminal A has 33 gates, Terminal B has 24 gates, and Terminal C has 68 gates.

Gate numbering starts in Terminal A with Gate 1, skipping gate 13, and ends in Terminal C. Wayfinding signage throughout the terminals was designed by Paul Mijksenaar, who also designed signage for LaGuardia and JFK Airports.

Terminal A
The Port Authority approved the project to build a new Terminal A, replacing the original terminal, which opened in 1973. Built on a site once occupied by United Parcel Service and the United States Postal Service, the new terminal cost around $2.7 billion and includes redesigned roadways with 8 new bridges, a new six-level, 2,700-car parking garage and rental center, 33 gates, and a walkway to connect the AirTrain station, parking garage, and terminal building. The terminal officially opened on December 8, 2022. However, due to continued testing of the fire alarm and security system as well as a hesitance from the PANYNJ to open a brand new terminal ahead of the 2022 holiday season, the grand opening was delayed to January 12, 2023, at which 21 of the total 33 gates opened. The remaining gates are projected to open later in 2023.

Designed by Grimshaw Architects, the redevelopment offers more traffic lanes at pick-up and drop-off points, closer check-in counters and security areas to the entrance, and more gate flexibility to allow planes to park at any gate in a "common-use" system. The new Terminal A has four levels: the departures level, the mezzanine level for offices, the arrivals level, and the ground floor, where baggage claim is located. The terminal is operated as EWR Terminal One LLC by Munich Airport International, a subsidiary of Munich Airport, which manages the terminal's operations, maintenance, and concessions in the 1 million square feet of retail space. The redevelopment also comes with plans to replace the existing AirTrain monorail system, scheduled to open in 2024, and was not opened along with the new Terminal A.

21 gates are primarily being used by United Airlines, although Air Canada, American Airlines, and JetBlue also operate out of the new Terminal A. Delta will operate out of the terminal. The remaining 12 gates will be commissioned prior to the end of 2023. Multiple technologies in the terminal, such as check-in and security, have been partly-automated. The terminal's design has been noted for its use of art from local artists, art on digital columns, a new variety of restaurants and stores, and easy access to power outlets. The terminal was designed to fit New Jersey's "Garden State" (the state's nickname) image. The new terminal also has a designated section for ridesharing company pickups, public transportation, and taxis.

Terminal B 

Terminal B was completed in 1973 and has four levels. Terminal B is the only passenger terminal directly operated by the Port Authority. It handles most foreign carriers, such as Icelandair, Lufthansa, Austrian Airlines, and some of United's international arrivals.

In 2008, Terminal B was renovated to increase capacity for departing passengers and passenger comfort. The renovations included expanding and updating the ticketing areas, building a new departure level for domestic flights and building a new arrivals hall. In January 2012, Port Authority executive director Patrick Foye said $350 million would be spent on Terminal B, addressing complaints by passengers that they cannot move freely. Further developments were made to Terminal B when the Port Authority installed new LED fixtures in 2014. The LED fixtures, developed by Sensity Systems, use wireless network capabilities to collect and feed data into the software that can spot long lines, recognize license plates, and identify suspicious activity and alert the appropriate staff. The full renovation of Terminal B was complete by May 2014.

Terminal C

Terminal C, designed by Grad Associates, was completed in 1988. Terminal C is exclusively operated by and for United Airlines and its regional carrier United Express for their global hub. The main terminal building for Terminal C was built alongside Terminals A and B in the 1970s, but lay dormant until People Express Airlines took it over as a replacement for the former North Terminal when the airline's hub there outgrew the old facility.

From 1998 to 2003, Terminal C was rebuilt and expanded in a $1.2 billion program known as the Continental Airlines Global Gateway Project. The project, which was designed by Skidmore, Owings & Merrill, doubled the available space for outbound travelers as the former baggage claim/arrivals hall was remodeled and turned into a second departures level. International Concourse C-3, a new facility with capacity for a maximum of 19 narrow-body aircraft (or 12 wide-body planes), was added as well.  Completion of this new concourse increased Terminal C's mainline jet gates to 57. Accompanying Concourse C-3 was a new international arrivals facility. Also included in the project were an airside corridor connecting Concourses C-1, C-2, and C-3, a President's Club (now United Polaris Lounge) for international business class passengers between C-2 and C-3, and new baggage processing facilities, including reconstruction of the former underground parking area into a new baggage claim and arrivals hall.

In November 2014, airport amenity manager OTG announced a $120 million renovation plan for Terminal C that included installing 6,000 iPads and 55 new restaurants headed by celebrity chefs, with the first new restaurants opening in summer of 2015 and the whole project completed in 2016. In 2019, Terminal C was named 'Best for Foodies' in the nation by Fodor's Travel Awards.  The C1 concourse of Terminal C has Classified, which is an invite-only eatery for United passengers.

Former Terminals

North Terminal (1953—1997) 
The North Terminal opened in 1953. Former Terminal A and present Terminal B opened in 1973, although some charter and international flights requiring customs clearance remained at the North Terminal prior to the opening of two new terminals. Following significant expansion at EWR, People Express Airlines made a deal with the Port Authority to use the North Terminal as its air terminal and corporate office in 1981 and began operations at Newark that April. When People Express merged with Continental Airlines in 1987, operations at the North Terminal were reduced. In 1997, the North Terminal was closed and then demolished making place for new cargo facilities.

Terminal A (1973—2023)
Terminal A was completed in 1973 and was closed on January 12, 2023, when the new Terminal A opened. It was operated by EWR Terminal One LLC, part of Flughafen München GmbH. Terminal A handled only domestic and Canadian flights served by JetBlue (for domestic flights), Air Canada, Air Canada Express, American Airlines, American Eagle; and some United Express flights.

In Terminal A, there was one United Club in Terminal A's second concourse (A2). It also had an Admirals Club for American Airlines and a Air Canada Maple Leaf Lounge. Terminal A was the only terminal that had no immigration facilities; flights arriving from other countries could not use Terminal A (except countries with U.S. customs preclearance), although some departing international flights used the terminal. In 2016, the Port Authority approved and announced a redevelopment plan to build a new Terminal A replacing this one. Part of Terminal A was closed for demolition on September 30, 2021. The remainder of the former Terminal A was closed to the public, and replaced with the new Terminal A on January 12, 2023.

Ground transportation

Train

A monorail system, AirTrain Newark, connects the terminals with Newark Liberty International Airport Station. The station is served by New Jersey Transit's Northeast Corridor Line and North Jersey Coast Line, with connections to regional rail hubs such as Newark Penn Station, Secaucus Junction and New York Penn Station where transfers are available to any rail line in northern New Jersey or Long Island, New York. Amtrak's Northeast Regional and Keystone Service trains also stop at the Newark Liberty International Airport station. Passengers can ride the AirTrain for free between the terminals and the parking lots, parking garages, and rental car facilities.

In September 2012, the Port Authority of New York and New Jersey announced that work would commence on a study to explore extending the PATH system to the station. The new station would be located at ground level to the west of the existing NJ Transit station. In 2014, the Board of Commissioners approved a formal proposal to extend the PATH to Newark Airport. On January 11, 2017, the Port Authority released its 10-year capital plan that included $1.7 billion for the extension. Under the plan, construction was projected to start in 2020, with service in 2026.  construction has yet to begin due to funding issues.

In January 2019, New Jersey Governor Phil Murphy announced a plan for a $2 billion replacement project for AirTrain Newark. Murphy stated that replacement is necessary because the system is reaching the end of its projected 25-year life and is subject to persistent delays and breakdowns. The Port Authority would be responsible for funding the project. In October 2019, the Port Authority board approved the replacement project with an estimated cost of $2.05 billion. On May 5, 2021, the Port Authority issued requests for proposals to four teams.

Bus

NJT buses operate northbound local service to Irvington, Downtown Newark and Newark Penn Station, where connections are available to the PATH and NJ Transit rail lines. The go bus 28 is a bus rapid transit line to Downtown Newark, Newark Broad Street Station and Bloomfield Station. Southbound service travels to Elizabeth, Lakewood, Toms River and intermediate points. NJ transit also operates bus routes 37, 62, and 67 to EWR. Olympia Trails operates express buses to the Port Authority Bus Terminal, Bryant Park, and Grand Central Terminal in Manhattan, and Super-Shuttle and Go-link operate shared taxi services as well as GO Airport Shuttle.

In addition, United Airlines's bus service and Trans-Bridge Lines offer shuttles to Lehigh Valley International Airport (ABE). Continental Airlines, which later merged into United, previously operated flights from Newark to Allentown, but switched to a bus service in 1995 due to constant delays from air traffic control. Trans-Bridge Lines also goes to EWR from on the Allentown-Clinton-New York eastbound and westbound route using both ABE and the Allentown Bus Terminal in Allentown, Clinton's Park and Ride, and the Port Authority Bus Terminal in New York with several stops in Lehigh and Northampton counties.

Road

Private limousine, car service, and taxis also provide service to/from the airport. For trips to/from New York, fares are set by the New York City Taxi and Limousine Commission.

The airport is served directly by U.S. Route 1/9, which provides connections to Route 81 and Interstate 78, both of which have interchanges with the New Jersey Turnpike (Interstate 95) at exits 13A and 14, respectively. The interchange where U.S. Route 1/9, U.S. Route 22, New Jersey Route 21, Interstate 78, and Interstate 95 is known as the Newark Airport Interchange. Northbound, Route 1/9 becomes the Pulaski Skyway, which connects to Route 139. Route 139 continues east to the Holland Tunnel, which links Jersey City with Lower Manhattan.

The airport operates short and long term parking lots with shuttle buses and monorail access to the terminals. The Port Authority's electric shuttle bus fleet comprising 36 buses and 19 chargers, was completed in October 2020 at Newark, John F. Kennedy International, and LaGuardia airports. A free cellphone lot waiting area is available for drivers picking up passengers at the airport.

Airlines and destinations

Passenger

Cargo

Statistics

Top destinations

Airline market share

Annual traffic

Airport information
Newark Airport, along with LaGuardia and JFK airports, uses a uniform style of color-coded signage throughout the airport properties, designed Paul Mijksenaar. Former New York City traffic reporter Bernie Wagenblast provides the voice for the airport's radio station and curbside announcements, as well as the messages heard onboard AirTrain Newark and in its stations. The airport has the IATA airport code EWR, rather than a designation that begins with the letter 'N' because the designator of "NEW" is already assigned to Lakefront Airport in New Orleans. Also, the Department of the Navy uses three-letter identifiers beginning with N for its purposes.

Accidents and incidents
 On March 17, 1929, a Colonial Western Airlines Ford Tri-Motor suffered a double engine failure during its initial climb after takeoff, failed to gain height, and crashed into a railroad freight car loaded with sand, killing 14 of the 15 people on board. At the time, it was the deadliest aviation accident in American history.
 On January 14, 1933, Eastern Air Transport, a Curtiss Condor, crashed at Newark; two crewmembers were killed.
 On May 4, 1947, Union Southern Airlines, a Douglas DC-3 with 12 passengers and crew, crashed on landing at Newark after overrunning the runway and into a ditch where it burned. Two crewmembers were killed.
 On December 16, 1951, a Miami Airlines C-46 Commando (converted for passenger use) lost a cylinder on takeoff from Runway 28 and crashed in Elizabeth, killing 56.
 On January 22, 1952, American Airlines Flight 6780, a Convair 240, crashed in Elizabeth on approach to Runway 6, killing 30.
 On February 11, 1952, National Airlines Flight 101, a Douglas DC-6, crashed in Elizabeth after takeoff from Runway 24, killing 33.
 On April 18, 1979, a New York Airways commuter helicopter on a routine flight to LaGuardia Airport and John F. Kennedy International Airport plunged  into the area between Runways 4L/22R and 4R/22L, killing three passengers and injuring 15. It was later determined the crash was due to a failure in the helicopter's tail rotor.
 On March 30, 1983, a Learjet 23 operated by Hughes Charter Air, a night check courier flight, crashed on landing at EWR during an unstabilized approach. Both crewmembers were killed. Marijuana was later found in their systems, believed to have impaired judgement.
 On July 31, 1997, FedEx Flight 14, a McDonnell Douglas MD-11, crashed while landing after a flight from Anchorage International Airport. The Number 3 engine contacted the runway during a rough landing, which caused the aircraft to flip upside down. The aircraft was destroyed by fire. The two crewmembers and three passengers escaped uninjured.
 On September 11, 2001, United Airlines Flight 93 took off from Newark Airport bound for San Francisco. It was hijacked by four al-Qaeda terrorists and diverted towards Washington, D.C., with the intent of crashing the plane into either The Capitol building or the White House. After learning about the previous attacks on the World Trade Center and The Pentagon, the passengers attempted to retake control of the plane. The passengers then forced the hijackers to crash the plane into a field near Shanksville, Pennsylvania.
 On May 1, 2013, Scandinavian Airlines Flight 908, an A330-300 that was cleared for takeoff, collided with an ExpressJet Embraer ERJ-145 aircraft on the taxiway. The ERJ-145 lost its tail in the accident.

See also

 New Jersey World War II Army Airfields

References

Sources

External links

 Newark Liberty International Airport (official site)
 "World's Busiest Airport" Popular Mechanics, May 1937
 
 How To Get To Newark Airport
 Aviation: From Sand Dunes to Sonic Booms, a National Park Service Discover Our Shared Heritage Travel Itinerary
 

 
Airports in New Jersey
Port Authority of New York and New Jersey
Transportation in Elizabeth, New Jersey
Transportation in Newark, New Jersey
Airfields of the United States Army Air Forces Air Transport Command in North America
Airfields of the United States Army Air Forces in New Jersey
Historic American Engineering Record in New Jersey
Historic Civil Engineering Landmarks
Buildings and structures in Newark, New Jersey
Airports established in 1928
Buildings and structures in Elizabeth, New Jersey
U.S. Route 1
U.S. Route 9
New Jersey Turnpike
1928 establishments in New Jersey
Transportation buildings and structures in Essex County, New Jersey